= The New Jersey Churchscape =

Book and website by Frank L. Greenagel

The New Jersey Churchscape: Encountering Eighteenth and Nineteenth-Century Churches
- Author: Frank L. Greenagel
- Subject: Religion
- Genre: Non-fiction
- Published: 2001
- Publisher: Rutgers University Press

The New Jersey Churchscape: Encountering Eighteenth and Nineteenth-Century Churches is a book and website written by Frank L. Greenagel.

The book was published by Rutgers University Press in 2001 and covers synagogues and meeting houses as well as churches.

It took five years of research and covers 225 buildings from the eighteenth and nineteenth centuries, presenting photographs along with commentary. As the New York Times observes, what's striking is the diversity of religious structures in New Jersey, a state that "was always more religiously diverse than New England." And yet, the Times continues, the book still provides us with the sense of a "typical New Jersey church."

In total, there are approximately 1,400 churches, synagogues and meeting houses in New Jersey that were built before 1900. Greenagel continues to photograph and research them, and is in the process of publishing a complete, county by county inventory of all the surviving 18th- and 19th-century churches in the state. Hunterdon, Morris, Somerset, Sussex, and Warren Counties have been completed as of 2007.
